The 2021 Junior Pan American Games (Spanish: Juegos Panamericanos Junior 2021) was an international multi-sports event for athletes aged 17 to 22 in the Americas, organized by Panam Sports held in Cali and Valle, Colombia between November 25 to December 5, 2021.

Candidate cities 
The deadline for the presentation of candidacy to organize the first Junior Pan American Games was January 31, 2019, on which date Cali, Santa Ana, and Monterrey were selected as host city candidates by Panam Sports. Cali was chosen as the host city by the Executive Committee in San José, Costa Rica on March 27, 2019.

Cali, Colombia 
Colombia Olympic Committee President Baltazar Medina noted that the reason Cali applied to host the games was to open the possibility of Colombia hosting larger multi-sports events, such as the Bolivarian Games and the Central American and Caribbean Games. Cali would be the main city for the games, while Palmira, Buga, and Calima El Darién would act as sub-centers. Notably, 2021 will be the 50th anniversary of the 1971 Pan American Games, which is the last time that Cali hosted the Pan American Games.

Santa Ana, El Salvador 
On January 29, 2019, Mayoress Milena Calderón Sol de Escalón confirmed that Santa Ana would apply to be the host of the inaugural games, stating, "We are preparing all the presentations we have to do before the International Olympic Committee. It will be in Costa Rica where El Salvador, through Santa Ana, will be presented (to host the 2021 Junior Pan American Games)."

Monterrey, Mexico 
President of the Mexican Olympic Committee Carlos Padilla Becerra expressed interest in Monterrey hosting the inaugural Junior Games, stating, "Mexico hopes that the competition can take place in Monterrey in 2021; it is a city that has the adequate infrastructure to carry them out, and it a minimum expenditure would be necessary." However, there was a risk from lack of government support that caused the bid to be eliminated from the final vote.

Venues
Cali and six other locales (Buga, Yumbo, Jamundí, Calima El Darien, Palmira and Barranquilla) in Colombia will stage the competitions.

Cali

Buga

Barranquilla

Jamundí

Calima El Darien

Palmira

Yumbo

The Games

Sports
321 events in 28 sports were contested. The full sport program was confirmed in September 2020. After originally being included, basketball (5x5), BMX freestyle and field hockey were not included on the final list. Other Olympic events and disciplines not contested included open water swimming, water polo, canoe slalom, equestrian, soccer and rugby sevens.

Numbers in parentheses indicate the number of medal events to be contested in each sport/discipline.

 Aquatics
 
 
 
 
 
 
Baseball

 
 
  
 Canoe sprint (12)
 
 BMX (2)
 Mountain biking (2)
 Road (4)
 Track (12)
 
 
 Artistic gymnastics (14)
 Rhythmic gymnastics (8)
 Trampoline (4)
 
 
 
 
 
 Figure Skating (2)
 Skateboarding (2)
 Speed Skating (12)
 
 
 
 

 
 
 
 
 Volleyball
 
 
 
 
 Freestyle (12)
 Greco-Roman (6)

Participating National Olympic Committees
All 41 nations who are members of the Panam Sports are expected to compete. The numbers in parenthesis represents the number of athletes qualified.

Schedule

Medal table
The official medal table:

References

External links
Cali-Valle 2021 website
Cali-Valle 2021 Facebook website

 
Junior Pan American
Pan American Games
Multi-sport events in Colombia
Junior Pan American Games
International sports competitions hosted by Colombia
Junior Pan American Games
Junior Pan American Games
Sport in Cali